Existence Is Futile is the thirteenth studio album by English extreme metal band Cradle of Filth, released on 22 October 2021 through Nuclear Blast. It is the band's only album to feature keyboardist and backing vocalist Anabelle Iratni and the last album with guitarist Richard Shaw before his departure in May 2022. This album also saw the return of Doug Bradley to provide narration for two tracks. It is the sixth Cradle of Filth release on which he appears, but the first since 2011's Evermore Darkly.

Background 
Describing the album's style, frontman Dani Filth said:

Fast and slow parts (and faster still), new delectable flavours and those reminiscent of earlier COF albums galore, massive choruses and melancholic drop-downs, old skool melodic NWOBM amid furious, scathing black metal amid apocalyptic groove. But I would say it's not very different from 'Cryptoriana'. It's not as intricately laced. That album spoke of the times it was trying to assimilate and represent. This album is about existential terror. The threat of everything. The end of the world, the end of one's life, existential dread. A little hope, I guess in there. It's a CRADLE OF FILTH record. The songs are strong. They're extreme, but it's a mixture of everything.

Artwork
The artwork was created by Arthur Berzinsh, who also worked on Hammer of the Witches and Cryptoriana – The Seductiveness of Decay. For Existence Is Futile he took inspiration from The Garden of Earthly Delights by Dutch artist Hieronymus Bosch; in particular, the "Prince of Hell" in the right "hellscape" panel of the triptych.

Critical reception 
The album received positive reviews from music critics upon the album's release.

At Metacritic, which assigns a normalized rating out of 100 to reviews from mainstream critics, the album has an average score of 83 based on 4 reviews, indicating "Universal acclaim". AllMusic gave the album a positive review, saying, "The band's grandiose hellscapes can sometimes feel like horror-fiction cosplay, but in trading some of the myth and magic for the genuine torment of existential dread, they've managed to produce their most humanistic work to date."

Blabbermouth.net gave the album a positive review, stating "In fact, it's that slight hint that CRADLE OF FILTH are commenting on real-world events, arguably for the first time, that gives "Existence Is Futile" its unique edge. This is a top-notch album that fans of the band will instantly adore, but it's also a restless and authentically unsettling affair; reflective of the dark times we live in, but also a sincere tribute to the sturdiness our collective resolve as followers of the dark musical arts. If a band of this vintage can rage against the dying of the light with this much style, substance and intensity, there may yet be hope for the rest of us."

Kerrang! gave the album 4 out of 5 and stated: "True enough. And only a band so conversant in morbidity, metal and gallows wit could articulate it so brilliantly as this. If you've slept on Cradle of Filth recently, now is your chance to redeem yourself. For those who know - they're back at their hellish best."

Track listing

Personnel 
Credits for Existence Is Futile adapted from liner notes.

Cradle of Filth
 Dani Filth – lead vocals, lyrics
 Martin 'Marthus' Škaroupka – drums, keyboards, orchestration
 Daniel Firth – bass
 Richard Shaw – guitars
 Marek 'Ashok' Šmerda – guitars
 Anabelle Iratni – keyboards, female vocals, orchestration, lyre

Additional personnel
 Doug Bradley – narration on "Suffer Our Dominion", and "Sisters of the Mist"

Production
 Scott Atkins – production
 Jon Phipps – choir arrangements
 Arthur Berzinsh – cover art
 James Sharrock – photography
 Dan Goldsworthy – layout, illustrations

Charts

References 

2021 albums
Cradle of Filth albums
Nuclear Blast albums